In head and neck cancer, Ohngren's line is a line that connects the medial canthus of the eye to the angle of the mandible.

The line defines a plane orthogonal to a sagittal plane that divides the maxillary sinus into (1) an anterior-inferior part, and (2) a superior-posterior part.
Tumours that arise in the anterior-inferior part, i.e. below Ohngren's line, generally have a better prognosis than those in the other group.
Addition to above a vertical line through pupil is also considered, which divides the above-mentioned structures into 4 different regions.
The structures at posterosuperior medial have worst prognosis and that at anteroinferior medial are least dangerous.

References

External links
Diagram showing Ohngren's line (imaging.consult.com)

Head and neck cancer